The Women's Singles event at the 2010 South American Games was held over March 21–24.

Medalists

Draw

Finals

Top Half

Bottom Half

References
Draw

Women's Singles